Iarinarivo is a town and commune in Madagascar. It belongs to the district of Ambohidratrimo (district), which is a part of Analamanga Region. The population of the commune was estimated to be approximately 12,000.

References and notes 

Populated places in Analamanga